Psychological dependence is a cognitive disorder that involves emotional–motivational withdrawal symptoms—e.g. anxiety and anhedonia—upon cessation of prolonged drug abuse or certain repetitive behaviors. It develops through frequent exposure to a psychoactive substance or behavior, though behavioral dependence is less talked about. The specific mechanism involves a neuronal counter-adaption, which could be mediated through changes in neurotransmitter activity or altered receptor expression. Environmental enrichment and physical activity can attenuate withdrawal symptoms. Psychological dependence is not to be confused with physical dependence, which induces physical withdrawal symptoms upon discontinuation of use. However, they are not mutually exclusive.

Symptoms 
Symptoms of psychological dependence include:

Anxiety
Panic attack
Dysphoria
Anhedonia
Craving
Stress

Development 
Psychological dependence is caused by consistent and frequent exposure to a drug or behavioural activity. It is often associated with effects of drug use, but it can also be caused by behavioural activity e.g. pornography.

The mechanism that generates dependence involves a neuronal counter-adaption, which is localized to areas of the brain responsible for a drug's positive reinforcement. This adaption occurs as a change in neurotransmitter activity or in receptor expression.

Change in neurotransmitter activity

Studies have shown that in rats experiencing ethanol withdrawal, stimulant withdrawal or opioid withdrawal, the nucleus accumbens shows lower levels of serotonin and dopamine than controls.  These decreases are associated with depression and anxiety.

In anatomically distinct areas of the rat brain, withdrawal is linked to lower levels of GABA and neuropeptide Y as well as higher levels of dynorphin, corticotropin-releasing factor, and norepinephrine; these fluctuations  can contribute to psychological dependence.

Altered receptor expression

Changes in receptor expression have also been linked to various symptoms of drug withdrawal. For example, in a study of rats undergoing nicotine withdrawal there has been observed a down regulation of α6β2*n-icotinic acetylcholine receptors in the mesostriatal dopaminergic pathways.

Methods for reducing dependence 
A study examined how rats experienced morphine withdrawal in different surroundings. The rats were either placed in a standard environment (SE) or in an enriched environment (EE). The study concluded that EE reduced depression and anxiety withdrawal symptoms.

Another study tested whether swimming exercises affected the intensity of perceivable psychological symptoms in rodents during morphine withdrawal. It concluded that the anxious and depressive states of the withdrawal were reduced in rats from the exercise group.

Distinction between psychological and physical dependence 

The major differences between psychological dependence and physical dependence are the symptoms they cause. While symptoms of psychological dependence relate to emotional and motivational impairment, physical dependence entails somatic symptoms e.g. increased heart rate, sweating, tremor. The type of dependence experienced after chronic use varies between different substances (see table 1).

Although psychological dependence and physical dependence are distinct entities, they should not be characterized as mutually exclusive. Empirical studies have shown that cravings, which are traditionally associated with psychological dependence, involve a physiological element.

See also 

Substance dependence
Substance use disorder

References

Substance dependence
Psychopathological syndromes